Antonio Esposito (5 September 1990) is an Italian footballer who plays for Lupa Roma.

Biography
Born in Naples, Campania, Esposito started his professional career with Ligurian club Spezia. He made his league debut in the second last match of 2007–08 Serie B season, which the team later went bankrupt.

In summer 2008, he was signed by Internazionale and played for its senior youth team – Primavera. He won 2009–10 UEFA Champions League as unused member of 25-men senior squad. He also played twice for Inter first team in friendly matches, as a left back.

On 14 July 2010, he graduated from the youth team and loaned to Serie B club Padova. However, he only played twice in 2010–11 Coppa Italia. On 31 January 2011, he left for Monza.

In July 2011 he had a trial at Gubbio. On 31 August, he was signed by Piacenza.

References

External links
 Lega Calcio Profile 
 La Gazzetta dello Sport (2007–08) Profile 
 
 
 

Italian footballers
Serie B players
Spezia Calcio players
Inter Milan players
Calcio Padova players
Treviso F.B.C. 1993 players
Association football fullbacks
Footballers from Naples
1990 births
Living people
S.F. Aversa Normanna players